Thespian may refer to:

 A citizen of the Ancient Greek city of Thespiae
 An actor or actress
 Thespis, the first credited actor
 A member of the International Thespian Society, an honor society that promotes excellence in high school theater
 "The Thespian", the sixth song of The Emptiness, the third studio album by American band Alesana
 Evah Destruction

See also
 Thespian grass mouse, a rodent species